The enzyme 4-phytase catalyzes the following reaction:

myo-inositol hexakisphosphate + H2O  1D-myo-inositol 1,2,3,5,6-pentakisphosphate + phosphate

myo-Inositol hexakisphosphate is also known as phytic acid.

These enzymes belongs to the family of hydrolases, specifically those acting on phosphoric monoester bonds. The systematic name of this enzyme class is myo-inositol-hexakisphosphate 4-phosphohydrolase. Other names in common use include 6-phytase (name based on 1L-numbering system and not 1D-numbering) and phytate 6-phosphatase.

Enzymes of this type participate in inositol phosphate metabolism.

See also 

 3-phytase (1-phytase)
 5-phytase
 Protein tyrosine phosphatase

References

EC 3.1.3
Enzymes of unknown structure